Pınarbaşı is a village in the Kemer District of Burdur Province in Turkey. Its population is 134 (2021).

References

Villages in Kemer District, Burdur